Gunther von Hagens (born Gunther Gerhard Liebchen; 10 January 1945) is a German anatomist who invented the technique for preserving biological tissue specimens called plastination. He has organized numerous Body Worlds public exhibitions and occasional live demonstrations of his and his colleagues' work, and has traveled worldwide to promote its educational value. The sourcing of biological specimens for his exhibits has been controversial, but he insists that informed consent was given before the death of donors, and extensive documentation of this has been made available.

Early life and education
Hagens was born Gunther Gerhard Liebchen in Alt-Skalden (now called Skalmierzyce) near Ostrowo, Reichsgau Wartheland, in German-annexed Poland. When he was five days old, his parents took him on a six-month trek westwards, to escape from the advancing Red Army and the imminent Soviet occupation. The family lived briefly in Berlin and its vicinity, before finally settling in Greiz, a small town which was allocated to the Soviet occupation zone, so that Hagens grew up in East Germany. He lived in Greiz until the age of nineteen. 

A haemophiliac, as a child Hagens spent six months in hospital after being injured. This stimulated an interest in medical science, and in 1965 he began to study medicine at the University of Jena. While there, he began to question Communism and Socialism, and widened his knowledge of politics by gathering information from non-communist news sources. He participated in student protests against the 1968 invasion of Czechoslovakia by Warsaw Pact troops. In January 1969, disguised as a vacationing student, he made his way across Bulgaria and Hungary, and on 8 January attempted to cross the Czechoslovakian border into Austria. He failed, but made a second attempt the next day, at another location along the border. He was arrested and punished with two years in jail.

Hagens escaped to West Germany in 1970. He continued his medical studies in Lübeck and received a doctorate in 1975 from the University of Heidelberg. When he married his first wife, he changed his surname from Liebchen to that of his wife, "von Hagens".

Career
Hagens is best known for his plastination technique, which he invented and patented between 1977 and 1982. In 1982, Hagens was appointed as a lecturer in the Institutes of Anatomy and Pathology at the University of Heidelberg, and in 1993 he founded the Institute of Plastination in Heidelberg. By 2004, he had been in the city for 22 years. In 1996 he became a visiting professor at Dalian in China, where he runs a second plastination institute, and he also directs a plastination center at the State Medical Academy in Bishkek, Kyrgyzstan. Since 2004, Hagens has also been a guest professor at the New York University College of Dentistry.

In its first twenty years, plastination was used to preserve small specimens of tissue for medical study. It was not until the early 1990s that equipment was developed to make it possible to plastinate whole body specimens, each specimen taking up to 1,500 hours of work to prepare. The first exhibition of whole plastinated bodies took place in Japan in 1995. Over the next two years, Hagens developed his first Body Worlds exhibition, showing whole bodies plastinated in lifelike poses and dissected to show various structures and systems of human anatomy, and these have since met with public interest and controversy in more than fifty cities around the world. The exhibition, and Hagens' subsequent exhibitions Body Worlds 2, 3 and 4, had received more than 26 million visitors all over the world .

To produce specimens for a Body Worlds exhibition, Hagens employs 340 people at five laboratories in four different countries. Each laboratory is categorized by speciality, with the laboratory in China focusing on animal specimens. The plastinated giraffe which appeared in Body Worlds 3 & The Story of the Heart was one of the most difficult specimens to create,  taking a total of three yearsten times longer than it takes to prepare a human body. Ten people were required to move the giraffe, because its final weight, like all specimens after plastination, was equal to its original weight.

The Body Worlds exhibits were featured in a supposed Miami exhibition in the 2006 film Casino Royale, although the actual location for the exterior shots was the Ministry of Transport in Prague. Hagens himself makes a cameo appearance in the film and can be seen leading a tour past where James Bond kills a villain.

Hagens has developed new body sectioning methods that yield very thin slices, which can then be plastinated and used for anatomical studies. He is also developing similar techniques for specimens as large as elephants. He works in a concealed laboratory, with an entrance behind a movable staircase, where he developed his wafer plastination techniques.

Controversy
Religious groups, including representatives of the Roman Catholic Church and some rabbis, have objected to the display of human remains, stating that it is inconsistent with reverence towards the human body.

In 2002 Hagens performed the first public autopsy to take place in the United Kingdom in 170 years, before a sell-out audience of 500 people in a London theatre. Prior to performing the autopsy, he had received a letter from Her Majesty's Inspector of Anatomy, the British government official responsible for regulating the educational use of cadavers. The letter warned Hagens that performing a public autopsy would be a criminal act under section 11 of the Anatomy Act 1984. The show was attended by officers from the Metropolitan Police, but they did not intervene, and the dissection was performed in full. The autopsy was shown in November 2002 on the British Channel 4 television channel; it resulted in over 130 complaints, an OFCOM record, but the Independent Television Commission ruled that the programme had not been sensationalist and had not broken broadcasting rules.

In 2003, the television production company Mentorn proposed a documentary called Futurehuman, in which Hagens would perform a series of modifications on a corpse to demonstrate "improvements" to human anatomy. Controversy was sparked when the company, with Hagens, appealed publicly for a terminally ill person to donate his body for the project. A donor was found, but the documentary was cancelled after the body donor pulled out.

In February 2004, the German newspaper Süddeutsche Zeitung confirmed earlier reports by the German TV station ARD that Hagens had offered a one-time payment and a lifelong pension to Alexander Sizonenko if he would agree to have his body transferred to the Institute of Plastination after his death. He declined the offer.

After several legal challenges to the Body Worlds exhibitition in Germany, in the Summer of 2004 Hagens announced that it would be leaving the country. From 2004 onwards, the exhibitions toured North America, returning to Europe in 2007 with an exhibition in Manchester, England, and ending in Copenhagen, Denmark, in 2011.

Hagens has accepted bodies into his collection whose origins he could not verify. Hagens stored 647 bodies at his business in Liaoning province, China. Two bodies with bullet holes in their skulls were sourced from Dalian University and some have speculated that these bodies could have been executed prisoners.

Legal accusations
In 2002 there were legal proceedings against a senior pathologist and coroner in Siberia regarding a shipment of 56 corpses to Heidelberg. The police maintained that the Novosibirsk coroner, Vladimir Novosylov, had sold the bodies illegally to buyers outside of Russia. Hagens was not charged in the case, but he was called as a witness against Novosylov. The authorities stopped the shipment of bodies and the agreement between Novosibirsk and Hagens was terminated.

In October 2003, a parliamentary committee in Kyrgyzstan investigated accusations that Hagens had illegally received and plastinated several hundred corpses from prisons, psychiatric institutions and hospitals in Kyrgyzstan, some without prior notification of the families. Hagens himself testified to the committee; he said he had received nine corpses from Kyrgyzstan hospitals, that none of them had been used for the Body Worlds exhibition, and that he was neither involved with nor responsible for the notification of the families.

In 2003, an animal rights organization filed a complaint alleging that Hagens did not have correct papers for a gorilla he had plastinated. He had received the cadaver from the Hanover Zoo, where the animal had died.

In 2003, the University of Heidelberg filed a criminal complaint against Hagens, claiming that he had misrepresented himself as a professor from a German university in a Chinese document, and that in Germany he had failed to state the foreign origin of his title. After a trial, he received a fine in March 2004. On 25 April 2005, a Heidelberg court imposed a fine of €108,000 (equivalent to a prison term of 90 days at the daily income assessed by the court) for one count of using an academic title that he was not entitled to, but acquitted him on four other counts. On appeal, a higher court in September 2006 reduced the penalty to a warning with a suspended fine of €50,000, which under German law is not deemed a prior criminal conviction. In 2007 the charge of title misuse was finally dismissed by the Federal Court of Justice of Germany in Karlsruhe.

German prosecutors declined to press charges, and in March 2005 Hagens was granted an interim injunction against Der Spiegel, preventing the magazine from claiming that Body Worlds contained the bodies of executed prisoners.

Personal life
Hagens describes himself as an agnostic, believing that the human mind is not constructed to answer such a question as the existence of God, and he instead puts all his faith into the human body.

Hagens is married to Angelina Whalley, the creative director of the Body Worlds exhibitions. He has three children from his first marriage and also retains his first wife’s surname,  "von Hagens". When appearing in public, even when performing anatomical dissections, Hagens always wears a black fedora (a reference to the hat worn in The Anatomy Lesson of Dr. Nicolaes Tulp by Rembrandt).

Hagens has said that his grand goal is the founding of a "Museum of Man", where exhibits of human anatomy can be shown permanently. He once commented that after death he planned to donate plastinated wafers of his own body to several universities, so that in death he can (physically) teach at several locations, something he cannot do while alive.
However, he later changed his mind about this. 

In January 2011, Hagens announced that he was suffering from Parkinson's disease and that after his death his wife would plastinate his body and put his preserved corpse on display as part of the Body Worlds exhibitions. In October 2018, before the opening of a Body Worlds exhibition in London to put plastinated human body parts on permanent display, Hagens said he wanted his own remains one day to be posed in the entrance, with his hand outstretched to greet visitors.

Television appearances
In 2005, Channel 4 screened four programmes entitled Anatomy for Beginners, featuring Gunther von Hagens and the pathology professor John Lee dissecting a number of cadavers and discussing the structure and function of many of the body's parts.

A four-part follow-up series entitled Autopsy: Life and Death was aired on Channel 4 in 2006, in which Hagens and Lee discussed common fatal diseases (circulatory issues, cancer, poisoning from organ failure, and ageing) with the aid of dissections.

He made a guest appearance in an episode of the 2004 BBC series Regency House Party.

In November 2007, another series of three television programmes was broadcast entitled Autopsy: Emergency Room, showing what happens when the body is injured, and featuring presentations by the British Red Cross.

References

Further reading

Patents
 Animal and vegetal tissues permanently preserved by synthetic resin impregnation, filed November 1977, issued May 1980
 Animal and vegetal tissues permanently preserved by synthetic resin impregnation, filed November 1979, issued July 1981
 Method for preserving large sections of biological tissue with polymers, filed August 1980, issued March 1982

External links

True Anatomy for New Ways of Teaching von Hagens Plastination offers one-of-a-kind, real human teaching specimens!
Official Site of Body Worlds

1945 births
German agnostics
German anatomists
Living people
20th-century German inventors
People with haemophilia
People with Parkinson's disease